Janet Loxley Lewis (August 17, 1899 – December 1, 1998) was an American novelist, poet, and librettist.

Biography
Lewis was born in Chicago, Illinois, and was a graduate of the University of Chicago, where she was a member of a literary circle that included Glenway Wescott, Elizabeth Madox Roberts, and her future husband Yvor Winters.  She was an active member of the University of Chicago Poetry Club. She taught at both Stanford University in California, and the University of California at Berkeley.

She wrote The Wife of Martin Guerre (1941) which is the tale of one man's deception and another's cowardice. Her first novel was The Invasion: A Narrative of Events Concerning the Johnston Family of St. Mary's (1932).  Other prose works include The Trial of Soren Qvist (1947), The Ghost of Monsieur Scarron (1959), and the volume of short fiction, Good-bye, Son, and Other Stories (1946).

Lewis was also a poet, and concentrated on imagery, rhythms, and lyricism to achieve her goal.  Among her works are The Indians in the Woods (1922), and the later collections Poems, 1924–1944 (1950), and Poems Old and New, 1918–1978 (1981). She also collaborated with Alva Henderson, a composer for whom she wrote three libretti and several song texts.

She married the American poet and critic Yvor Winters in 1926.  Together they founded Gyroscope, a literary magazine that lasted from 1929 until 1931.

Lewis was elected a Fellow of the American Academy of Arts and Sciences in 1992. She died at her home in Los Altos, California, in 1998, at the age of 99.

Bibliography

Fiction
 The Invasion: A Narrative of Events Concerning the Johnston Family of St. Mary's (1932)
 The Wife of Martin Guerre (1941)
 Good-bye, Son, and Other Stories (1946)
 The Trial of Soren Qvist (1947)
 The Ghost of Monsieur Scarron (1959)
 Against a Darkening Sky (1985)

Poetry
 The Indians in the Woods. Published by Monroe Wheeler, as Manikin Number One, Bonn, Germany, n.d. [1922].
 The Wheel in Midsummer Lynn, Mass, The Lone Gull, 1927.
 The Earth-Bound' Aurora, New York, Wells College Press, 1946
 Poems 1924 – 1944 Denver, Alan Swallow, 1950
 The Ancient Ones Portola Valley, California: No Dead Lines, 1979
 The Indians in the Woods 2nd edition with new preface, Palo-Alto California, Matrix Press, 1980.
 Poems Old and New 1918 – 1978 Chicago/Athens, Ohio: Swallow Press / Ohio University Press 1981
 Late Offerings Florence, Ky, Robert L. Barth, 1988
 Janet and Deloss: Poems and Pictures San Diego, Brighton Press 1990
 The Dear Past and other poems 1919 – 1994 Edgewood Ky, Robert L. Barth, 1994
 The Selected Poems of Janet Lewis Athens, Ohio, Swallow Press / Ohio University Press, 2000, .

LibrettiThe Wife of Martin Guerre, opera in three acts after her novel, music by William Bergsma (1956)The Last of the Mohicans, opera in two acts after the novel by James Fenimore Cooper, music by Alva Henderson (1976)The Birthday of the Infanta, opera after the story by Oscar Wilde, music by Malcolm Seagrave (1979)The Swans, opera in three acts after the Brothers Grimm, music by Alva Henderson (1986)The Legend, opera after her novel The Invasion, music by Bain MurrayMulberry Street, opera after "The Room Across the Hall" by O. Henry, music by Alva Henderson (1988); later incorporated as Act II of West of Washington Square''

Notes

External links 
 Kathleen Foster Campbell Papers at Yale University Beinecke Rare Book and Manuscript Library
 Janet Lewis Oral History, conducted by Margo Davis (1977)
 Enduring Imagist: An Interview with Janet Lewis (1899–1998), conducted by Catherine J. Kordich and Michael Dylan Welch (1997, 1998)

1899 births
1998 deaths
20th-century American novelists
20th-century American poets
American women poets
American women short story writers
American women novelists
People from Los Altos, California
Stanford University Department of English faculty
University of California, Berkeley College of Letters and Science faculty
University of Chicago alumni
Writers from Chicago
Writers from the San Francisco Bay Area
American opera librettists
Fellows of the American Academy of Arts and Sciences
20th-century American women writers
Women librettists
20th-century American short story writers
Novelists from California
Novelists from Illinois
Women opera librettists